Senator Latta may refer to:

Bob Latta (born 1956), Ohio State Senate
Del Latta (1920–2016), Ohio State Senate
James P. Latta (1844–1911), Nebraska State Senate
John Latta (politician) (1836–1913), Pennsylvania State Senate